Hyderabad, in India, has a well-developed communication and media infrastructure, and the city is covered by a large network of optical fiber cables. The city's telephone system is serviced by four landline companies: BSNL, Tata Indicom, Reliance and Airtel. There are a number of mobile-phone companies: Aircel, BSNL, Airtel, Hutch Idea Cellular, Uninor, MTS, Virgin Mobile, Tata Indicom, Tata DoCoMo and Reliance. Several companies offer broadband internet access.

Broadcast radio 

The city has a variety of AM and FM radio stations. Two AM broadcasting|AM and two FM broadcasting FM stations in Hyderabad are operated by All India Radio (AIR), officially known as Akashvani. The first FM radio station to broadcast in the city was AIR's Vividh Bharati in the early 1990s. In 2006, Commercial broadcasting|commercial FM radio stations were launched in Hyderabad. These stations are broadcast 24 hours a day, seven days a week with programming in Telugu language, English and Hindi.

The FM radio stations in the city are:

 Bol Radio 90.4 MHz
 Radio City 91.1 MHz
 AIR Rainbow 101.9 MHz
 AIR Vividh Bharati 102.8 MHz
 BIG FM 92.7 92.7 MHz
 IGNOU Gyan Vani 105.6 MHz (educational station, on air from 18.00 to 22.00 hours)
 Deccan Radio 107.8 MHz
 RED FM 93.5 MHz
 Fever 94.3 FM Hindi Channel
 Radio Mirchi 95 MHz Hindi Channel, Known as Mirchi95.
 Radio Mirchi 98.3 FM Telugu Channel.
 KOOL 104 – (from the Radio Mirchi group) airs both Ryan Seacrest and Casey Kasem's AT40 – 104 FM
 Radio Charminar 107.8 MHz Urdu Channel
 Magic FM (India) 106.4 MHz

AM radio stations in the city are:

 Hyderabad-A 737 kHz
 Hyderabad-B 1377 kHz

Internet radio

 Radio Tulip (24/7 Non-Stop Telugu live radio) website Retrieved 2017-04-01.
 Deccan Radio (24/7 South Indian internet radio) website Retrieved 2011-09-05.
 Radio Archana (24/7 devotional station: Radio Archana Sravanam Bhakthi Ki Sopanam) website
 Radio Khushi (24/7 Telugu online radio) website Retrieved 2011-09-05.
 Telangana Radio (24/7 Telugu live radio) website Retrieved 2011-09-05.
 TeluguOne Radio (24/7 Telugu live radio  website Retrieved 2011-09-05.
 Tharangamedia website

Television networks
The first satellite television relay in Hyderabad was started in 1974, with the launch of the state-owned Doordarshan Kendra Hyderabad, which initially telecast through ATS-6 Satellite in collaboration with NASA. It was officially inaugurated on 23 October 1977. The private satellite channels in Hyderabad were started in July 1992, with the launch of Star TV. Today there are numerous satellite TV channels available in Hyderabad. An estimated 2.5 million households use cable TV in Hyderabad.

Doordarshan transmits two terrestrial television channels and one satellite channel from Hyderabad. The Doordarshan Telugu channel, Saptagiri, was the first TV channel launched in Hyderabad in the year 1974. Many private regional television channels began broadcasting from Hyderabad in the following decades. Doordarshan Kendra Hyderabad’s Regional Network in Telugu took on a new identity of "DD Saptagiri" on 2 April 2003. After bifurcation of Andhra Pradesh state, DD Saptagiri was relegated to being telecast from Doordarshan Kendra Vijayawada for Andhra Pradesh while the existing network, renamed DD Yadagiri, was aimed at the Telangana populace. DD Yadagiri's operations have been continued from its current Ramanthapur office, Hyderabad. The channel highlights the Telangana culture and dialect. In 2018, Andhra Prabha Publication entered into broadcasting space by launching India Ahead News, which was the first national English News channel from Southern India.

Telugu television channels broadcast from Hyderabad are:
Satellite channels

 v6 news telugu
 4TV
 99TV
 Aalami Samay
 ABN Andhrajyothi
 APtv
 ATV
 Ap24x7 (Telugu)
 Bhakti TV
 DD Yadagiri
 ETV Telugu|ETV
 ETV Telangana     * ETV Urdu      * Gemini Comedy
 Gemini Music
 Gemini News
 Gemini
 HMTV
 I News
 Jagrutitv News
 Laya News
 Maa Music
 Maa
 Maa movies
 Munsif TV
 NRI WBN
 NTV
 Prime9 News
 Sakshi
 TV 1
 Shubhavartha TV
 Studio N
 T news
 TV5
 TV9
 Vissa TV
 Zee Telugu

Cable channels

 Aap Tak TV Network – Charminar
 Azaad news TV 
 CTV
 Deccan TV 
 G24TV NEWS 
 Metro TV
 RK NEWS
 S9TV 
 TVH News Telangana

News Papers
Hyderabad has several newspapers in Telugu, English, Urdu and Hindi.

The major Telugu dailies include Eenadu, Sakshi, Maa Aksharam Mee Ayudham, Vaartha, Andhra Jyothi, Surya, Prajasakti, Andhra Bhoomi, Andhra Prabha, and Namaste Telangana. The major English dailies are The Times of India, The Hindu, The Deccan Chronicle, Hans India, Telangana Today, Business Standard and The Economic Times.

The major Urdu dailies are Siasat, Munsif, The Etemaad, and The Rahnuma-i Deccan, with The Daily Milap being in Hindi. Besides these major newspapers, there a number of localised neighbourhood newspapers catering to localities.

There are a handful of weekly newspapers in Urdu that enjoy good readership. Gawah Urdu Weekly, published by veteran journalist Dr. Syed Fazil Hussain Parvez is one of the oldest Urdu news weeklies published from Hyderabad and popularly recognized for its honest and critical editorials and continues to be in incessant publication since its inception in 1999. It is also the only weekly publication from Hyderabad with two doctorates on board and producing a professional daily news bulletin that is published on the web, through social media platforms like Facebook and YouTube.

Magazines
Hyderabad has several magazines in Telugu, English, Urdu and Hindi languages. The industry is well highlighted as a few of these Magazines host a couple of Hyderabad.

Telugu:

Magazines published in Hyderabad include the Neadu Telugu daily, Swati, Navya, Andhra Prabha, Andhra Jyoti, Crime Today, Vipula, Chatura, Vanita and Chandamama."Great andhra"

Film magazines include Tollywood, Sitara, Siva Ranjani, Santosham and Jyoti Chitra.

English:

A National Magazine produced in Hyderabad is You & I Magazine

Local Magazines published in Hyderabad are WOW, BPOSITIVE, etc...

Tollywood cinema

Hyderabad is the homeland of Tollywood, the Telugu movie industry. Apart from being a popular entertainment source and India's largest film producer as measured by the number of films made every year (followed by Bollywood), Tollywood also provides livelihood to thousands of its citizens and contributes a large amount of revenue to the local government. Previously, many Telugu films were produced in Madras. However, improvements in Hyderabad's infrastructure and initiatives such as establishing studios like Ramoji Film City (cited by the Guinness Book of World Records as the world's largest film studio), Saradhi Studios, Annapurna Studios, Ramanaidu Studios, Ramakrishna Studios and Padmalaya Studios have changed the situation. Not only Telugu films, but films from Bollywood are made in Hyderabad.

References

 
Hyderabad